XHARR-FM (96.5 FM) is a radio station in Doctor Arroyo, Nuevo León, known as Vive FM. XHARR is part of the Nuevo León state-owned Radio Nuevo León public network.

References

Radio stations in Nuevo León